Robot Wars by David Arkenstone is the soundtrack to a film of the same name, released in 1993.

Track listing
"Main Titles"  
"Desert Patrol"  
"Aftermath"  
"The Eastern Alliance"  
"Leda's Pictures"  
"Shim-Ku"  
"Ride to Crystal Vista"  
"Skirmish"  
"The Streets of Crystal Vista" 
"Underground Discovery" 
"Nightflight"  
"The Search for MEGA-1" 
"Opening the Tomb" 
"Pursuit (MEGA Rises)" 
"The Final Battle" 
"Love Theme and End Titles"  
 All tracks composed by David Arkenstone

Personnel
 David Arkenstone – performer
 Kostia – orchestrations
 Daniel Chase – percussion
 Jay Leslie – soprano saxophone and flutes on "The Streets of Crystal Vista"

1993 soundtrack albums
Science fiction film soundtracks